The Julius Work Calendar is the earliest surviving calendar in England. It was written on parchment at Canterbury Cathedral in around 1020, and is a valuable primary source of Anglo-Saxon history. After the dissolution of the monasteries it was salvaged by Sir Robert Cotton and kept in the Cotton Library; the "Julius" in its name is simply a reference to where it was stored in Cotton's library. Since 2000 it has been stored in the British Museum, catalogued as Cotton MS Julius A VI.

References
 Lacey, R. & Danziger, D. (1999) The Year 1000: What Life was Like at the Turn of the First Millennium, Little Brown & Co.

External links
 Online copy at the British Library website
 Entry at the British Library website

11th-century manuscripts